Delhi Charter Township is a charter township of Ingham County in the U.S. state of Michigan.  The population was 27,710 at the 2020 census, an increase from 25,877 in 2010 census.

Delhi Township is located directly south of the city of Lansing and is the fifth-largest municipality in Lansing–East Lansing metropolitan area.

Communities
Holt is an unincorporated community in the township that is also a census-designated place for statistical purposes. Holt is just south of Interstate 96 and is about 6 miles northwest of Mason.  About half the population of Delhi live in Holt, but many others (even outside the township) identify themselves as living in Holt, because they attend Holt Public Schools.
The city of Lansing is adjacent to the north and has incorporated land that was formerly within the township. Much of the township is considered to be part of the Greater Lansing urban area.
The city of Mason is nearby to the southeast and the village of Dimondale is to the west.

Geography

The Grand River flows through the southwestern part of the township, and Sycamore Creek flows through its northeastern part.

History
The first permanent settlers in Delhi Township, John Norris and Fred Luther, arrived in 1837. In 1850, 402 settlers resided in the township.  By 1857 Delhi Center (now Holt) had a post office, hotel, tavern, and several other businesses.

Demographics

2000 census
As of the census of 2000, there were 22,569 people, 8,563 households, and 6,268 families residing in the township. The racial makeup of the township was 92.95% White, 2.36% African American, 0.49% Native American, 1.15% Asian, 0.04% Pacific Islander, 0.94% from other races, and 2.06% from two or more races. Hispanic or Latino of any race were 3.56% of the population.

There were 8,563 households, out of which 40.0% had children under the age of 18 living with them, 57.4% were married couples living together, 11.9% had a female householder with no husband present, and 26.8% were non-families. 22.2% of all households were made up of individuals, and 7.6% had someone living alone who was 65 years of age or older.  The average household size was 2.61 and the average family size was 3.06.  In the township, the population was spread out, with 28.9% under the age of 18, 7.1% from 18 to 24, 30.7% from 25 to 44, 23.7% from 45 to 64, and 9.6% who were 65 years of age or older.  The median age was 36 years. For every 100 females, there were 91.5 males.  For every 100 females age 18 and over, there were 87.5 males.

The median income for a household in the township was $50,922, and the median income for a family was $61,837. Males had a median income of $45,774 versus $31,192 for females. The per capita income for the township was $23,485.  About 3.2% of families and 5.2% of the population were below the poverty line, including 5.8% of those under age 18 and 5.9% of those age 65 or over.

References

Sources

External links
Official Website of the Charter Township of Delhi
Holt–Delhi Branch of the Capital Area District Library

Townships in Ingham County, Michigan
Charter townships in Michigan
Lansing–East Lansing metropolitan area
1842 establishments in Michigan
Populated places established in 1842